The Man from Elysian Fields is a 2001 American drama film directed by George Hickenlooper, and starring Andy Garcia, Mick Jagger, Olivia Williams, Julianna Margulies, and James Coburn.

Synopsis
After one book that ended up in the remainder bins, novelist Byron Tiller's inability to pay the bills strains relations with his wife. Desperate for any kind of income, he meets Luther Fox, an Englishman who runs an exclusive escort service called Elysian Fields, and is offered a job.

Hiding his new employment from his wife, Byron finds that one of his clients, Andrea, is married to a much older, ill Pulitzer Prize-winning author whom Tiller greatly admires. Complications develop as he develops a relationship with the author, essentially cowriting his latest book.  Tiller faces new challenges as he tries to separate a professional obligation to the wife, his client, from a professional interest and responsibility to a fellow writer, her spouse.

Cast
 Andy Garcia as Byron Tiller
 Mick Jagger as Luther Fox
 Julianna Margulies as Dena Tiller
 Olivia Williams as Andrea Alcott
 James Coburn as Tobias Alcott
 Anjelica Huston as Jennifer Adler
 Michael Des Barres as Nigel Halsey
 Richard Bradford as Edward Rodgers

Reception
On review aggregation website Rotten Tomatoes the film had a rating of 51% based on 70 reviews, with an average of 5.9/10. The site's consensus states: "Critics Consensus: This story about a gigolo isn't plausible or compelling enough."
On Metacritic it has a score of 57 based on reviews from 26 critics, indicating "mixed or average reviews".

It was hailed as "One of the Best Films of 2002" by critic Roger Ebert.

References

External links
 
 
 

2001 films
American drama films
American independent films
2001 drama films
Film noir
Films about prostitution in the United States
Films about writers
Films directed by George Hickenlooper
Films scored by Anthony Marinelli
Gold Circle Films films
Shoreline Entertainment films
Fireworks Entertainment films
2001 independent films
2000s English-language films
2000s American films